Brandon Rutherford Ormonde-Ottewill (born 21 December 1995)  is an English professional footballer who plays as a left back for Hungarian Nemzeti Bajnokság I club Puskás Akadémia.

Career

Arsenal 
Ormonde-Ottewill started his football career within the Arsenal Academy at the age of 8. He continued through their ranks before signing a professional contract in 2012. He was released at the end of the 2014–15 season along with Abou Diaby, Ryo Miyaichi, Jack Jebb, Semi Ajayi, Josh Vickers and Austin Lipman.

Swindon Town 
In July 2015, Ormonde-Ottewill joined Swindon Town on a free transfer upon his release from Arsenal. He made his first appearance for the club in a pre-season fixture against Everton which ended in a 4–0 defeat. His competitive debut came on the opening day of the 2015–16 Football League season when he played the full match in a 4–1 victory over Bradford City. In April 2016, Ormonde-Ottewill was suspended by the club alongside teammates Drissa Troare and Jeremy Balmy. The club statement came hours after it was reported the trio were seen inhaling nitrous oxide gas on social media.

On 2 May 2017, it was announced that Ormonde-Ottewill would leave Swindon upon the expiry of his contract in June 2017.

Netherlands
On 28 July 2017, following his release from Swindon, Ormonde-Ottewill joined Dutch side Helmond Sport on a one-year deal. 
After making just one appearance all season due to injury, Ormonde-Ottewill joined fellow Dutch side FC Dordrecht on a two-year deal with the option of an additional year. After being loaned to SBV Excelsior in January 2020, he signed a two-year permanent deal with the club in the summer of that year.

Hungary 
In September 2022, Ormonde-Ottewill joined Nemzeti Bajnokság I side Puskás Akadémia on a free transfer, signing a one-year deal.

International career
Brandon Ormode-Ottewill has represented England at both under 16 and under 19 level.

Career statistics

External links

References

1995 births
Living people
English footballers
Association football defenders
Arsenal F.C. players
Swindon Town F.C. players
Helmond Sport players
FC Dordrecht players
Excelsior Rotterdam players
Eerste Divisie players
English Football League players
England youth international footballers
English expatriate footballers
English expatriate sportspeople in the Netherlands
Puskás Akadémia FC players
Expatriate footballers in Hungary
English expatriate sportspeople in Hungary